Cryptotaenia, or honewort, is a genus of herbaceous perennial plants, native to North America, Africa, and eastern Asia, growing wild in moist, shady places.

Species
Species accepted by The Plant List as of August 2014. Some studies have suggested that the African and Canary Island species should be moved to other genera and that the Italian endemic Lereschia thomasii should be included in Cryptotaenia, but we list them here provisionally pending further study.

Cryptotaenia africana (Hook.f.) Drude - Gabon
Cryptotaenia calycina C.C.Towns. - Tanzania
 Cryptotaenia canadensis (L.) DC. - eastern + central North America
Cryptotaenia elegans Webb ex Bolle - Canary Islands
Cryptotaenia flahaultii (Woronow) Koso-Pol. - Republic of Georgia
 Cryptotaenia japonica Hassk. - Japan, Korea, China
Cryptotaenia polygama C.C.Towns. - Tanzania

References

External links
 Efloras.org: Taxonomy description of Cryptotaenia japonica
 Plants for a Future database.org: Cryptotaenia japonica

Apioideae
Edible Apiaceae
Taxa named by Augustin Pyramus de Candolle
Apioideae genera